

Queue may refer to:

 Queue area, or queue, a line or area where people wait for goods or services

Arts, entertainment, and media
ACM Queue, a computer magazine
 The Queue (Sorokin novel), a 1983 novel by Russian author Vladimir Sorokin
 The Queue (Abdel Aziz novel), a 2013 novel by Egyptian author Basma Abdel Aziz

Mathematics and technology
Queue (abstract data type), a type of data structure in computer science
Circular queue
Double-ended queue, also known as a deque
Priority queue
FIFO (computing and electronics)
Load (computing) or queue, system load of a computer's operating system
Message queue
Queueing theory, the study of wait lines

Other uses
 Queue (hairstyle), a Manchurian pigtail
 The Queue, a queue to view the coffin of Queen Elizabeth II during her lying in state

See also
Cue (disambiguation)
FIFO (disambiguation)
First-come, first-served
Q (disambiguation)
Q, the letter
Que (disambiguation)

ja:待ち行列
pl:Kolejka
sv:Kö